The village of Hančaroŭka is located in the Babruysk District of Mogilev Region. The name Hančaroŭka probably originates from the Belarusian word hančar (ганчар-). It was founded in 1925 by the peasants of the local villages. In 1926 there were 5 houses and 23 people in the village. In 1934 kolkhoz "Stalin's victory" was founded. In 1941-1944 the village was occupied by the Nazi troops. In 1967 the village Novaja Vioska (New village) was incorporated in Hančaroŭka. In 1997 it was 78, in 2008 - 61 people living in Hančaroŭka. At the village cemetery there is a monument established in 1975 in memory of the soviet soldiers.

Sources 
Ганчароўка // Памяць. Бабруйскі раён : Гісторыка-дакументальныя хронікі гарадоў і раёнаў Беларусі / Гал. рэд. Г.П. Пашкоў. –Мн., 1998. – с.196

Populated places in Mogilev Region
Babruysk District
Villages in Belarus